Pandit Bhimsen Gururaj Joshi (4 February 1922 – 24 January 2011), also known by the honorific prefix Pandit, was one of the greatest Indian vocalists from Karnataka, in the Hindustani classical tradition. He is known for the khayal form of singing, as well as for his popular renditions of devotional music (bhajans and abhangs). Joshi belongs to the Kirana gharana tradition of Hindustani Classical Music. He is noted for his concerts, and between 1964 and 1982 Joshi toured Afghanistan, Italy, France, Canada and USA. He was the first musician from India whose concerts were advertised through posters in New York City. Joshi was instrumental in organising the Sawai Gandharva Music Festival annually, as homage to his guru, Sawai Gandharva.

In 1998, he was awarded the Sangeet Natak Akademi Fellowship, the highest honour conferred by Sangeet Natak Akademi, India's National Academy for Music, Dance and Drama. Subsequently, he received the Bharat Ratna, India's highest civilian honour, in 2009.

Early life 
Bhimsen Joshi was born on 4 February 1922 in a Kannada Deshastha Rigvedi Brahmin family of Madhva Sampradaya to Gururajrao Joshi and Godavaribai at Gadag in Dharwad district that was then in the Bombay Presidency of British India. His father, Gururaj Joshi, was a school teacher. Bhimsen was the eldest among 16 siblings. He lost his mother at a young age.

As a child, Joshi was fascinated with music and musical instruments like the harmonium and tanpura and would often follow processions accompanied by music bands. This exercise often tired him and he would curl up somewhere and sleep, forcing his parents to go to the police after efforts to trace him failed. Fed up, his father Gururajacharya Joshi came up with the solution, writing "son of teacher Joshi" on Joshi's shirts. This worked and those who found the boy sleeping would safely deposit him back to his house.

Musical training 

His first music teacher was Channappa of Kurtakoti, who had trained with the veteran singer Inayat Khan. After learning Ragas Bhairav and Bhimpalasi, the one and only unique vigorous style of rendering he developed along with advanced trainings by other teachers is attributed to the basic training he received from Channappa.

Searching for a guru 

Joshi heard a recording of Abdul Karim Khan's Thumri "Piya Bin Nahi Aavat Chain" in Raga Jhinjhoti when he was a child, which inspired him to become a musician. During this time, he also heard Pandit Sawai Gandharva at a performance in Kundgol. In 1933, the 11-year-old Joshi left Dharwad for Bijapur to find a master and learn music. With the help of money lent by his co-passengers in the train, Joshi reached Dharwad first and later went to Pune. Later he moved to Gwalior and got into Madhava Music School, a school run by Maharajas of Gwalior, with the help of famous sarod player Hafiz Ali Khan. He traveled for three years around North India, including in Delhi, Kolkata, Gwalior, Lucknow and Rampur, trying to find a good guru. He met Ustad Mushtaq Husain Khan of Rampur Gharana and stayed for more than one year. Eventually, his father succeeded in tracking him down in Jalandhar and brought young Joshi back home.

Sawai Gandharva 

In 1936, Sawai Gandharva, a native of Dharwad, agreed to be his guru. Joshi stayed at his house in the guru-shishya (teacher-student) tradition.  Joshi continued his training with Sawai Gandharva.

Career 

Joshi first performed live in 1941 at the age of 19. His debut album, containing a few devotional songs in Marathi and Hindi, was released by HMV the next year in 1942. Later Joshi moved to Mumbai in 1943 and worked as a radio artist. His performance at a concert in 1946 to celebrate his guru Sawai Gandharva's 60th birthday won him accolades both from the audience and his guru. In 1984, he received his 1st Platinum Disc, being the first Hindustani Vocalist to receive the award.

Hindustani classical music 

Joshi's performances have been acknowledged by music critics such as S. N. Chandrashekhar of the Deccan Herald to be marked by spontaneity, accurate notes, dizzyingly-paced taans which make use of his exceptional voice training, and a mastery over rhythm. In his especially mid singing career (i.e. the 60s & 70s) Joshi's most iconic and noticeable trait was his use of swift and long aakar taans, exemplifying tremendous and almost unrivalled breath-control, although he rarely used sargam taans. The Hindu, in an article written after he was awarded the Bharat Ratna, said: Bhimsen Joshi was ever the wanderer, engendering brilliant phrases and tans more intuitively than through deliberation. His music often injected surprising and sudden turns of phrase, for example through the unexpected use of boltaans. Over the years, his repertoire tended to favour a relatively small number of complex and serious ragas; however, he remained one of the most prolific exponents of Hindustani classical music. Some of Joshi's more popular ragas include Shuddha Kalyan, Miyan Ki Todi, Puriya Dhanashri, Multani, Bhimpalasi, Darbari, Malkauns, Abhogi, Lalit, Yaman, Asavari Todi, Miyan ki malhar and Ramkali. He was a purist who has not dabbled in experimental forms of music, except for a series of Jugalbandi recordings with the Carnatic singer M. Balamuralikrishna.

Joshi's singing has been influenced by many musicians, including Smt. Kesarbai Kerkar, Begum Akhtar and as aforementioned, Ustad Amir Khan. Joshi assimilated into his own singing various elements that he liked in different musical styles and Gharanas.
He along with Smt. Gangubai Hangal along with others took Kirana gharana to heights and are proudly referred as worthy son and daughter of kirana gharana. Both were from Old Dharwad district.

Devotional music 

In devotional music, Joshi was most acclaimed for his Hindi and Marathi and Kannada Bhajan singing. He has recorded bhakti songs in Marathi,Santavani, Kannada Dasavani.

Patriotic music 

Joshi was widely recognised in India due to his performance in the Mile Sur Mera Tumhara music video (1988), which begins with him and which was composed originally by him when he was asked to do so by the then Prime Minister Rajiv Gandhi. The video was created for the purpose of national integration in India, and highlights the diversity of Indian culture. Joshi was also a part of Jana Gana Mana produced by A. R. Rahman on the occasion of the 50th year of Indian Republic.

Playback singing 

Joshi sang for several films, including Basant Bahar (1956) with Manna Dey, in Marathi movie "Swayamvar zale Siteche" (1964) for famous song "Ramya Hi Swargahun lanka", in Kannada movie Sandhya Raga (1966) where he has sung extensively. It includes a song "e pariya sobagu" rendered in both Hindustani and Carnatic styles along with M. Balamuralikrishna. He sang Birbal My Brother (1973) with Pandit Jasraj. He also sang for the Bengali film Tansen (1958) and Bollywood Movie Ankahee (1985) which later fetched him National Film Award for Best Male Playback Singer. His song 'Bhagyadalakshmi baaramma', a Purandara Dasa composition, was used by Anant Nag and Shankar Nag in the Kannada film Nodi Swami Naavu Irodhu Heege. He also sang as a playback singer for the Marathi film Gulacha Ganapati, produced and directed by P. L. Deshpande

Sawai Gandharva Music Festival 

Joshi and his friend Nanasaheb Deshpande organised the Sawai Gandharva Music Festival as a homage to his guru, Sawai Gandharva, along with the Arya Sangeet Prasarak Mandal in 1953, marking Gandharva's first death anniversary. The festival has been held ever since, typically on the second weekend of December in Pune, Maharashtra also in kundagol Dharwad district and has become not only a cultural event for the city, but an annual pilgrimage for Hindustani Classical music lovers all over the world. Joshi conducted the festival annually since 1953, until his retirement in 2002.

Legacy 
A classicist by training and temperament, Joshi was renowned for having evolved an approach that sought to achieve a balance between what may be termed as "traditional values and mass-culture tastes" and as such he went on to have supposedly the largest commercially recorded repertoire in Hindustani vocal music. Pt. Joshi's iconic status in the music world has earned him a whole generation of  who by merely listening to him have picked up his style and not through any formal tutelage.
His greatest endeavour in perpetuating his legacy could be the Sawai Gandharva Festival held at Pune annually since the year 1953 which seeks to promote a certain music culture.

Madhav Gudi, Prof Baldev Singh Bali, Narayan Deshpande, Shrikant Deshpande, Shrinivas Joshi, Anand Bhate and others are some of his more well-known disciples.

In September 2014, a postage stamp  featuring Joshi was released by India Post commemorating his contributions to Hindustani music.

Personal life 

Joshi married twice. His first wife was Sunanda Katti, the daughter of his maternal uncle, whom he married in 1944. He had four children from Sunanda; Raghavendra, Usha, Sumangala, and Anand. In 1951, he married Vatsala Mudholkar, his co-actor in the Kannada play Bhagya-Shree. Bigamous marriages among Hindus were prohibited by law in the Bombay Presidency; so he took up residency in Nagpur (capital of Central Province and Berar in 1951) where bigamy was allowed and married there for the second time. He did not divorce or separate from Sunanda. With Vatsala, he had three children; Jayant, Shubhada, and Shrinivas Joshi. Initially, both his wives and families lived together, but when this did not work out, his first wife moved out with the family to live in a house in Limayewadi in Sadashiv Peth, Pune, where Joshi continued to visit them.

Joshi struggled with alcoholism, which he overcame by the late 1970s.

Outside of music, Joshi was passionate about cars and had a deep knowledge of auto mechanics.

Death
Joshi was admitted to Sahyadri Super Speciality Hospital on 31 December 2010 with gastrointestinal bleeding and bilateral pneumonia. Due to difficulty in breathing, he was put on ventilator support. He suffered convulsions and was put on dialysis too during his stay in hospital. Though he recovered briefly for three days when he was taken off the ventilator, his condition deteriorated thereafter. He died on 24 January 2011 . He was cremated at Vaikunth Crematorium in Pune with full state honours.

Discography

Awards and recognitions 

 1972 – Padma Shri
 1976 – Sangeet Natak Akademi Award
 1985 – Padma Bhushan
 1985 – National Film Award for Best Male Playback Singer
 1986 – "First platinum disc"
 1999 – Padma Vibhushan
 2000 – "Aditya Vikram Birla Kalashikhar Puraskar"
 2002 – Maharashtra Bhushan
 2003 – "Swathi Sangeetha Puraskaram" by Government of Kerala
 2005 – Karnataka Ratna
 2008 – Bharat Ratna
 2008 – "Swami Haridas Award"
 2009 – "Lifetime achievement award" by Delhi government
 2010 – "S V Narayanaswamy Rao National Award" by Rama Seva Mandali, Bangalore
 2017 – Bharatratna Pandit Bhimsen Joshi Hospital By Mira Bhayander Municipal Corporation, Bhayander West

References

Further reading 

 
 
 
 Pt. Bhimsen Joshi, a biography by Dr Sadanand Kanavalli in Kannada

External links 

Bhimsen Joshi at Encyclopædia Britannica
Bhimsen Joshi at The Economist
 Bhimsen Joshi Picture Album
 Bhimsen Joshi: List of Classical Vocal Recordings
 A films division documentary on Bhimsen Joshi
 A blog on recitals of Bhimsen Joshi

Recipients of the Bharat Ratna
Hindustani singers
20th-century Khyal singers
Singers from Karnataka
Kannada people
Indian Hindus
Recipients of the Karnataka Ratna
Recipients of the Padma Bhushan in arts
Recipients of the Padma Shri in arts
Recipients of the Padma Vibhushan in arts
Recipients of the Sangeet Natak Akademi Award
Recipients of the Sangeet Natak Akademi Fellowship
People from Gadag district
Recipients of the Maharashtra Bhushan Award
Marathi-language singers
Marathi playback singers
1922 births
2011 deaths
Kirana gharana
20th-century Indian male classical singers
Best Male Playback Singer National Film Award winners
Madhva Brahmins